NSCR may refer to:

EV12 North Sea Cycle Route, a long-distance cycling route
North–South Commuter Railway, an urban rail line in Luzon, Philippines
Netherlands Institute for the Study of Crime and Law Enforcement, a component of the Netherlands Organisation for Scientific Research
National Sexuality Resource Center, a US-based advocacy organization
Nova Scotia Central Railway, a predecessor of the Halifax and South Western Railway
National Society for Cancer Relief, a British charity
Narrabri Shire Community Radio, a community radio station in Narrabri, New South Wales, Australia
National Security and Civil Rights Program, a program of the Asian Law Caucus